The 2003 Sudirman Cup was the 8th tournament of the World Mixed Team Badminton Championships of Sudirman Cup. It was held from March 18 to March 23, 2003 in Eindhoven, Netherlands. South Korea won in this eighth edition of the championship against China in the final 3–1.

Host city selection
International Badminton Federation decided to split the IBF World Championships and the Sudirman Cup as separate tournaments starting from 2003. Canada, China, England, Hong Kong, and the Netherlands were the countries interested in hosting the tournaments. Netherlands later announced as host for the first standalone Sudirman Cup tournament.

Results

Group 1

Subgroup 1A

Subgroup 1B

Relegation playoff

Semi-finals

Final

Group 2

Subgroup 2A

Subgroup 2B

Playoff

Group 3

Subgroup 3A

Subgroup 3B

Playoff

Group 4

Subgroup 4A

Subgroup 4B

Playoff

Group 5

Subgroup 5A

Subgroup 5B

Playoff

Group 6

Subgroup 6A

Subgroup 6B

Playoff

Group 7

Final classification

References

Sudirman Cup
Sudirman Cup
Sudirman Cup
2003 Sudirman Cup
International sports competitions hosted by the Netherlands
March 2003 sports events in Europe
21st century in Eindhoven